Kiumars Saghafi was an Iranian military officer who held office as the acting commander of the Air Force for a short period of time in early 1979. In the wake of revolutionary retirements, he was appointed to the position by Mohammad-Vali Gharani on 12 February 1979, but resigned a few days later.

References

Commanders of Islamic Republic of Iran Air Force